The Hodgenville Women's Club, on the Public Square in Hodgenville, Kentucky, is a women's clubhouse which was built in 1934.  It was listed on the National Register of Historic Places in 1991.

The club was organized in 1919with the purpose of bettering the community through social, civic, and arts projects. Mrs. C. J. Hubbard was instrumental in forming the group whose slogan was "Better Hodgenville." Activities of the Club in the 1920s and 1930s included improvements in the city cemetery, assisting the Red Cross, sponsoring local entertainment and lectures, organizing tree plantings in the city, and promoting Lincoln's heritage in the county. No other similar group was in existence in Hodgenville in these years and the Club's membership boasted some of the town's most leading citizens.

It purchased the property in 1921 and raised funds for a clubhouse building throughout the 1920s.  With Federal Works Project Administration funding of $2,646 for labor, and $1,500 of the Club's funds for materials, it was built in 1934 and formally opened in 1935.

The building is a one-story stone-veneer building with some Colonial Revival stylings in its interior mantles and decorative door surrounds.

References

Women's clubhouses in the United States
Women's clubs in the United States
Clubhouses on the National Register of Historic Places in Kentucky
National Register of Historic Places in LaRue County, Kentucky
Colonial Revival architecture in Kentucky
Cultural infrastructure completed in 1934
1934 establishments in Kentucky
History of women in Kentucky
Works Progress Administration in Kentucky
Hodgenville, Kentucky